The AutoGyro MT-03 is a German autogyro, designed and produced by AutoGyro GmbH of Hildesheim.  The aircraft is supplied as a complete ready-to-fly-aircraft.

The MT-03 was approved in the United Kingdom in 2007 in a modified form as the RotorSport UK MT-03.

Design and development

The MT-03 features a single main rotor, a two-seats in tandem open cockpit with an optional partial cockpit fairing, tricycle landing gear with wheel pants and a four-cylinder, air and liquid-cooled, four-stroke, dual-ignition  Rotax 912 engine or turbocharged  Rotax 914 engine in pusher configuration.

The aircraft fairing is made from composites.

The MT-03 was developed into the MTOsport and the fully enclosed AutoGyro Calidus.

Operational history

An AutoGyro MT-03 was used by Norman Surplus in his nine-year global circumnavigation that ended in 2019; the first to be done in an autogyro.

Variants

AutoGyro MT-03
Base model for the European and North American market. No longer in production.
RotorSport UK MT-03
Modified model for the United Kingdom market, imported assembled and modified by RotorSport UK.
AutoGyro MTOsport
Improved model for the European and North American market. This model offers a choice of three different rotor systems, two different propellers, two engine choices (Rotax 912S or 914) and floats.
AutoGyro MT0-Free
Version of the MTOsport, with no cockpit fairing fitted. This leaves the pilot out in the open air and has the benefit of eliminating the need for rudder input when turning, as the fairing acts as a  destabilizer.

Operators

Military

Ethiopian Air Force - 2 for special operations

Specifications (MT-03)

References

External links

2000s German sport aircraft
Single-engined pusher autogyros
AutoGyro GmbH aircraft